The John W. McCormack State Office Building, also referred to by its address 1 Ashburton Place, is a high-rise building adjacent to the Beacon Hill neighborhood in Boston, Massachusetts. The building stands at 401 feet (122 m) with 22 floors. Construction began in 1972 and was completed in 1975. It is currently the 26th-tallest building in Boston. The architectural firm who designed the building was Hoyle, Doran & Berry. The McCormack Building is notable because of its distinctive black and white façade.

Tenants 
Some tenants of the office block include:
Office of the Massachusetts Attorney General
 Massachusetts Civil Service Commission
 Office of the Comptroller
 Executive Office of Education
 Massachusetts Department of Higher Education
 Massachusetts Executive Office of Technology Services and Security
 Office of the Commissioner of Probation
 Massachusetts State Police H-1 Government Center Barracks

See also
List of tallest buildings in Boston

References

External links
Entry on Emporis
Entry on SkyscraperPage

Skyscraper office buildings in Boston
Government buildings completed in 1975
Beacon Hill, Boston
Government of Massachusetts

Office buildings completed in 1975